The United States Public Health Service Commissioned Corps uses the same commissioned officer rank structure as the United States Navy and Coast Guard: from ensign to admiral (O-1 through O-10).  While the commissioned corps is authorized to use warrant officer ranks W-1 to W-4 under the U.S. Code of law, it does not currently use these ranks.

Rank insignia

History
The present-day commissioned corps has its origins in the career corps of the Marine Hospital Service, which was established by federal legislation on January 4, 1889. The service adopted naval ranks in order to impose military discipline on the doctors of the service, and corresponded their service rank and grade with their medical title. The service continues to interchange officer ranks and service titles when referring to their grade.

1889–1902 (Marine Hospital Service)
Initially, the officer ranks and insignia of the Marine Hospital Service were as follows:

Officers of the Marine Hospital Service wore the same rank devices as officers in the armed forces, apart from the star of the surgeon general and the bars of passed assistant surgeons and assistant surgeons being gold instead of silver.

Effective October 1, 1893, the supervising surgeon general wore gold epaulettes in place of shoulder straps. Officers who once served in the grade of surgeon general and were then reverted to the grade of surgeon, were also authorized to wear silver oak leaf insignia regardless of years of service.

The rank structure was further revised with effect from July 1, 1896:

1902–1912 (Public Health and Marine Hospital Service)
By Act of Congress, on July 1, 1902, the Marine Hospital Service became the United States Public Health and Marine Hospital Service. The rank structure was correspondingly expanded, with the creation of the rank of assistant surgeon general.

The rank structure of the new Public Health and Marine Hospital Service was the following:

From 1912 (Public Health Service)
The United States Public Health Service was established by Act of Congress on August 14, 1912. In March 1914, the five-pointed gold star worn by the surgeon general was changed to silver, with the new rank of senior surgeon introduced between the ranks of surgeon and assistant surgeon general. The sleeve rank insignia were also altered to match those worn by Navy officers, with shoulder loops replacing straps. With effect from March 20, 1918, the gold bars worn by the ranks of passed assistant and assistant surgeons became silver, the same as the equivalent Army and Navy rank insignia. At the end of World War I, the rank insignia of the Commissioned Corps were as follows:

By an Act of April 9, 1930, the grade of surgeon general was raised to two-star rank.

A further Act in 1943 raised the four existing bureau chiefs to the grade of assistant surgeon general with the equivalency to the rank of brigadier general. With the Public Health Service Act of 1944, the grade of passed assistant was redesignated to senior assistant, and the new grade of junior assistant was established as equivalent to rank of second lieutenant or ensign. The 1944 Act further established the grade of director, to rank equivalent with a colonel or Navy captain, along with the one-star graded post of deputy surgeon general, also elevating assistant surgeon generals to one-star rank. The surgeon general was also elevated to two-star rank. At the end of World War II, the ranks and insignia of the Public Health Service Commissioned Corps were:

A further act of February 28, 1948 authorized two grades for officers in the grade of assistant surgeon generals, with not more than half of the authorized number to hold the grade equivalent to major generals or rear admirals. Public Law 89-288 was enacted on October 22, 1965, elevating the grade of surgeon general to three-star rank.

Notes

References

United States Public Health Service Commissioned Corps
Uniformed services of the United States